Alfred Kropp: The Thirteenth Skull is a young adult fantasy thriller by Rick Yancey.  In this novel Alfred starts realizing many things about his life and why he does things and he no longer is the bumbling overweight Alfred Kropp we meet in the first book but is becoming a grown man.

Characters
Alfred Kropp - Large teenage hero of the Alfred Kropp series
Samuel St. John - The former Operative Nine who swore to protect Alfred and be his legal guardian
Ashley - An old field agent who came back to OIPEP to be Alfred's Extraction Coordinator. Alfred's love interest.
Nueve - The new Operative Nine, as assigned by the board of OIPEP. He is described as Hispanic and 'suave'.
Abby Smith- The director of OIPEP
Jourdian Garmot- The son of Mogart who wants revenge for his father's death, and thus goes after Alfred
Vosch - Henchman of Jourdian Garmot who is extremely vicious. He cuts off Samuel's fingers while torturing him

References

Young adult fantasy novels
American young adult novels
2008 American novels
Bloomsbury Publishing books